The Santali Latin alphabet was invented in the 1890s by the Norwegian missionary Paul Olaf Bodding, and is still used by some Santhals, especially the members of the Northern Evangelical Lutheran Church (NELC). Since the Santhals had no alphabet till 1925 when Pandit Raghunath Murmu invented Ol chiki script in 1925, they adopted the Latin script, using certain diacritical marks to denote sounds that differ from those these letters have in English. This was done under the influence of Christian missionaries who were the first to take an active interest in the study of the Santali language.

Other script
The Santali language is also written using the Ol Chiki script.

References 

 Troisi, J (2000). “Tribal Religion”, Manohar Publishers & Distributors, 27.

Santhal
Latin alphabets
Santali language